Tell Sultan Yakoub is an archaeological site 2.5 km south of Tell Saatiya, 1 km west of Hammara in the Beqaa Mohafazat (Governorate) in Lebanon. It dates at least to the Bronze Age.

References

Baalbek District
Bronze Age sites in Lebanon